Commander Grant Edwards is a high-ranking Australian law enforcement officer and former elite athlete and strongman competitor and entrant to the World's Strongest Man competition.

Biography
Grant Edwards competed on the international circuit prior to his initial 1997 triumph in Australia's Strongest Man. He was well known for displays of strength and in the greatest feats of strength section of the 2001 edition of Guinness Book of Records, Grant Edwards was picked out for special mention for his feat of single-handedly pulling a 201-ton steam locomotive a distance of 36.8 metres along a railroad track at Thirlmere, NSW, Australia, on 4 April 1996. The 1999 win in Australia's Strongest Man led to an invitation to the prestigious World's Strongest Man in 1999. Drawn in the same group as Magnus Samuelsson, Edwards was directly matched up against the Swede in the log lift, losing 10 lifts to 2. Magnus won the group and Edwards failed to progress to the final. Edwards also pulled the 386 Tall Ship 'Bounty' in Sydney Harbour a distance of 25 metres on 3 April 1996. as well as a 220-ton steam locomotive for charity in Canberra in 1997. Other feats of strength include pulling C130 Military Aircraft at Richmond NSW for charity live on the former Channel 9 Midday Show with Kerri-Anne.

Over the course of his strongman career, Edwards exhibited his feats of strength on programs such as the Footy Show, Hey Hey it's Saturday and the Bert Newton Show. He regularly appeared on Nine's Wide World of Sports, Channel Seven's Sportsworld and ESPN.

Edwards was also a Highland Games competitor. One of his notable achievements was winning the Scottish heavy throws contest at the 1997 Rosneath and Clynder Highland Games. He totalled 30 points to defeat Robert McKee (US) and Ivo Degelling (Netherlands) who finished second equal with 27 points.

Prior to competing in strength events Edwards represented Australia in Track and Field in the shot put and hammer throw at Seoul Junior Open South Korea 1982 gaining a bronze medal. He would later be selected in the Australian University Team for Track and Field in 1996 in the same events. Edwards has recently returned to track and field at the Masters level and currently holds a number of Australian Master records in Field events.

In 1991 Edwards would change tack and became a member of the Australian Bobsleigh Team competing in the World Cup circuit throughout Europe and North America and as a member of the 1992 and 1994 Australian Winter Olympic Squad. He was also one of the original Australians to secure an American Football scholarship at the University of Hawaii in 1982.

Outside of his strongman and sporting career, Edwards pursued a career within the Australian police. He joined the Australian Federal Police (AFP) in 1985 and worked in Sydney, Newcastle, Canberra and Los Angeles covering such areas as family law, international drug trafficking and people smuggling. He established the AFP's Transnational Sexual Exploitation and Trafficking Team in 2003, which addresses crimes of transnational sexual exploitation and travelling child sex offenders.  From here he took the position of Chair of the Interpol Expert working Group on trafficking in Women and Children, becoming an international expert in this field.  He went on to work as the National Surveillance Coordinator, Coordinator of Transnational Crime Intelligence and in 2006 gained promotion to Commander, in his capacity as Manager Criminal Intelligence Collection. In January 2008, Commander Edwards was posted to East Timor (Timor-Leste) as Security Advisor to the Secretary of State for Security within the Government of East Timor. His work within this role was praised by the Minister for Home Affairs, Brendan O'Connor, who echoed and endorsed comments made by the East Timor Prime Minister Xanana Gusmão. O'Connor said "Praise from the Prime Minister of Timor-Leste His Excellency Kay Rala Xanana Gusmão today, is testament to Commander Edwards' professionalism and the dedication that he has brought to the role. His efforts have gone a long way to strengthening relationships between Australia and Timor-Leste".

References

Living people
Australian strength athletes
Australian police officers
Australian Federal Police
Australian powerlifters
Year of birth missing (living people)